Märt Martinson (also Mart Martinson; 8 September 1890 Puiatu Parish (now Viljandi Parish), Kreis Fellin  – 9 March 1948 Viljandi) was an Estonian politician. He was a member of II, III, IV and V Riigikogu.

References

1890 births
1948 deaths
People from Viljandi Parish
People from Kreis Fellin
Farmers' Assemblies politicians
Patriotic League (Estonia) politicians
Members of the Riigikogu, 1923–1926
Members of the Riigikogu, 1926–1929
Members of the Riigikogu, 1929–1932
Members of the Riigikogu, 1932–1934
Members of the Riigivolikogu